The Stade Robert-Diochon is a stadium in Le Petit-Quevilly, France.  It is currently used for football matches and is the home stadium of both FC Rouen and US Quevilly-Rouen.  As of 2022, the Rugby Union club Rouen Normandie Rugby are also using the stadium.  The stadium holds 12,018 spectators.

External links
Stadium information

Robert Diochon
FC Rouen
Buildings and structures in Rouen
Sports venues in Seine-Maritime
Sports venues completed in 1917
US Quevilly-Rouen Métropole